The 2021 Buffalo Bills–Kansas City Chiefs Divisional Round playoff game was a National Football League (NFL) game held on January 23, 2022, as part of the 2021–22 NFL playoffs. The Kansas City Chiefs defeated the visiting Buffalo Bills 42–36 to advance to the AFC Championship Game. Noted for the quarterback play of Buffalo's Josh Allen and Kansas City's Patrick Mahomes, it was the first NFL game in which both quarterbacks threw for at least 300 yards, three touchdowns, and no interceptions and rushed for at least 50 yards.

The game had four lead changes and 25 points scored in the final two minutes of regulation, the second-most among games in the Super Bowl era. After scoring on their opening drive, the Bills did not regain the lead until the fourth quarter when Allen threw a go-ahead touchdown pass with under two minutes remaining. Mahomes responded with a 64-yard touchdown pass to regain the lead with less than a minute remaining, but Buffalo's next possession ended in another touchdown pass from Allen. With 13 seconds left, Mahomes led the Chiefs on a 44-yard drive, which set up a game-tying field goal to force overtime. The Chiefs received the overtime kickoff after winning the coin toss and scored a touchdown to secure the victory. Despite the loss, Bills wide receiver Gabe Davis set the NFL playoff game record for receiving touchdowns at four.

The performances of both teams, particularly Allen and Mahomes, drew praise from commentators, who considered the game to be one of the greatest in the modern NFL playoffs. It is colloquially known as 13 Seconds after the Chiefs' game-tying drive and considered an example of the Buffalo Sports Curse. The game also renewed scrutiny of the NFL's overtime rules, which were changed beginning with the 2023 postseason onward to ensure both teams receive possession of the ball in overtime.

Background

The Chiefs finished the regular season with a 12–5 record to clinch the #2 seed of the American Football Conference (AFC). The Bills obtained a 11–6 record and were the AFC's #3 seed. At the end of the regular season, the Bills had the highest point differential and margin of victory, but lost every game that was within one possession.

With the emergence of quarterback Patrick Mahomes in 2018, the Chiefs became one of the top teams in the league. They hosted the AFC Championship Game over the past three seasons, appeared in the Super Bowl over the past two, and won Super Bowl LIV. The Bills had been on the rise since the breakout season of quarterback Josh Allen in 2020 and won consecutive AFC East division titles. The two teams met in the previous season's AFC Championship, which the Chiefs won 38–24. A regular season rematch followed, in which the Bills defeated the Chiefs 38–20 in a game on Sunday Night Football that was delayed in the middle of the game for an hour thanks to a thunderstorm in the Kansas City area.

The day before the game, the top-seeded Tennessee Titans were defeated in the Divisional Round by the fourth-seeded Cincinnati Bengals, guaranteeing the winner of the Buffalo–Kansas City matchup would host the AFC Championship. A Chiefs victory would make them the first NFL team to host four consecutive conference championships, while the Bills would host the AFC Championship for the first time since 1993 if they won.

Game summary

First quarter
Buffalo started off the game with a 15-play, 71-yard drive in which they converted two fourth downs, the second with a 1-yard touchdown run by Devin Singletary to go up 7–0. Kansas City responded with a 13-play, 74-yard drive in which quarterback Patrick Mahomes rushed three times for 48 yards, the last carry being an 8-yard touchdown run to tie the game at 7.

Second quarter

In the second quarter, Mahomes completed a 21-yard pass to Travis Kelce and Clyde Edwards-Helaire rushed for a 22-yard gain on an 81-yard drive to score on Mahomes' 2-yard touchdown pass to Byron Pringle, giving the Chiefs a 14–7 lead. The Bills countered with a drive in which Josh Allen rushed twice for 20 yards and completed 5/5 passes for 55, the last an 18-yard touchdown completion to Gabe Davis, tying the score at 14–14 with 42 seconds left in the half. Kansas City then advanced to the Bills 32, but Butker missed a 50-yard field goal attempt as the second quarter clock ran out.

Third quarter
The Chiefs started the second half with a 64-yard, 15-play drive, featuring a 20-yard catch by running back Jerick McKinnon. Butker finished it with a 39-yard field goal to give the team a 17–14 lead. Then after a punt, Edwards-Helaire rushed for a 20-yard gain and then receiver Mecole Hardman ran an end around play 25 yards for a touchdown, giving the Chiefs a 23–14 lead after Butker missed the extra point. Kansas City seemed to be pulling way from the Bills, but on the first play of Buffalo's next drive, Allen threw a 75-yard touchdown completion to Davis, making the score 23–21 with 2:06 left in the third quarter.

Fourth quarter
In the final period, Chiefs receiver Tyreek Hill returned a punt 45 yards to the Bills 16-yard line before being tackled by punter Matt Haack. Three plays later, Butker kicked a 28-yard field goal to put Kansas City up 26–21. Buffalo then covered 75 yards in 19 plays on a drive where they once again converted two fourth downs. On 4th and 4 from the Chiefs 24, Allen scrambled 6 yards for a first down. Three plays later, Singletary was then tackled for a 6-yard loss on 3rd and 7. When faced with 4th and 13, Allen threw a 27-yard touchdown pass to Davis, and followed it up with a pass to Stefon Diggs for a 2-point conversion that gave the Bills a 29–26 lead with 1:54 left on the clock. Kansas City stormed back, moving 75 yards in 7 plays and taking a 33–29 lead on Mahomes' 64-yard touchdown pass to Hill. Taking the ball back with 57 seconds remaining, Allen completed passes to Davis for gains of 28 and 12 yards before hitting Emmanuel Sanders with a 16-yard completion on the Kansas City 19-yard line. Then with just 13 seconds left on the clock, he threw a 19-yard touchdown pass to Davis to give Buffalo a 36–33 lead. On the subsequent kickoff, the Bills controversially elected to kick long rather than taking a squib kick to try and run off some of the clock; the ball went dead in the end zone, resulting in a touchback. Mahomes completed a 19-yard pass to Hill that ran just 5 seconds off the clock, then he threw a 25-yard pass to Kelce, giving Kansas City a first down on the Bills 31-yard line after running down another 5 seconds. On the next play, Butker's 49-yard field goal sent the game into overtime. Kelce was wearing an NFL Films microphone for the game, and audio footage from the two offensive plays of the 13-second drive revealed that Kelce instructed Hill to run the route which led to the success of the first completion, and revealed him suggesting to Mahomes that he might improvise his own route on the second offensive play if the Bills' defensive scheme didn't change. Prior to the snap, Mahomes realised Kelce's suggested improvised route would work and shouted "Do it, Kelce!", before finding his tight-end for a completion of 25 yards.

Overtime
Kansas City won the coin toss to begin the overtime period and elected to receive the ball. Getting the ball first in overtime, Mahomes rushed for 4 yards and completed 5/5 passes for 50 yards, including a 16-yard pass to McKinnon and a 26-yard throw to Hardman. On the next play, his 8-yard touchdown pass to Kelce won the game for Kansas City.

Statistics

Aftermath and reactions

The game was hailed as one of the greatest modern NFL playoff games, with some commentators initially proclaiming it not only as the best playoff game in history, but one of the greatest games ever played. It was the finale to a divisional round where every game came down to its final play; the other three games played that weekend were decided by game-winning field goals.

Buffalo fans were quick to refer to the game as "13 Seconds". Erik Brady of The Buffalo News equated the loss to the phenomenon of triskaidekaphobia, the fear or avoidance of the number 13, especially the coincidence that the 13th tarot card depicts The Grim Reaper, the subject of Andy Reid's motivational talk to Patrick Mahomes in the final seconds of regulation.

Early figures showed CBS averaging 34.5 million viewers for the game, but parent company ViacomCBS later said it was closer to 43 million, with a peak of 51.6 million at its frenetic conclusion. It was the highest-rated divisional game on any network since the 2017 playoffs. In the Chiefs' home market of Kansas City, 90 percent of households tuned in at the game's climax. On Twitter, Dan Rather, Stephen A. Smith, Candace Parker, and Magic Johnson were among those reacting to the game's wild ending.

Immediately after the game-winning touchdown pass, Mahomes ran across the field to locate Allen, where the two quarterbacks embraced and exchanged words of respect. Even before the game took place commentators drew comparisons between the competitive rivalry between Mahomes and Allen, who combined for over 700 passing yards and 7 touchdowns in the game, and that of Tom Brady and Peyton Manning. Upton Bell compared the matchup favorably to The Greatest Game Ever Played; he said, "I've been watching football for 75 years, and nothing compares to this Buffalo–Kansas City game. I have never seen two quarterbacks in a playoff game play at a higher level than Allen and Mahomes. I was at the 1958 Colts–Giants championship, and that doesn't compare to this game."

The Bills were also criticized for not using a squib kick on the final kickoff in regulation, where they instead kicked through the endzone for a touchback, leaving 13 seconds for the Chiefs, who had all three timeouts remaining, to quickly drive into field goal range for the game-tying kick. Had Buffalo kicked in-bounds and forced the Chiefs to return the ball, more time would have elapsed in the game and the Chiefs likely would not have been able to drive downfield to get into field goal range, though they might have had better field position. Bills head coach Sean McDermott simply stated, "That starts with me" when asked about why the team did not opt to squib kick.

As an homage to Bills fans' practice of crowdfunding charities as an act of gratitude, Chiefs fans sent a series of $13 donations to Allen's foundation, which supports Oishei Children's Hospital in Buffalo. In the following days after the game, Oishei Children's Hospital announced that Chiefs fans had raised $312,800 to donate to the hospital. In return, Bills fans encouraged their own cause to donate to Hope House in Kansas City, a shelter that helps victims of domestic violence.

The victory allowed Kansas City to advance to its fourth consecutive AFC Championship Game, becoming the first NFL team to host a conference championship game in four consecutive years. With the victory, Chiefs head coach Andy Reid became the first NFL coach to lead two different teams to four straight conferences championships. Reid previously led the Philadelphia Eagles to the NFC Championship Game from 2001 to 2004.

In the AFC Championship Game between the Chiefs and the Cincinnati Bengals, Butker also converted a game-tying field goal at the end of regulation and the Chiefs won the overtime coin toss to receive the ball first. Allen jokingly responded on his Twitter account to Kansas City winning a second consecutive coin toss by tweeting "Pain.". However, Mahomes was intercepted 13 seconds into the Chiefs' drive, which led to the Bengals winning 27–24 off a field goal from Evan McPherson. The official Bengals Twitter responded to Reid's comment by tweeting "DON'T FEAR THE REAPER!" after Blue Öyster Cult's song of the same name.

The following July, this AFC Divisional game won the 2022 ESPY Award for Best Game.

The Bills and Chiefs met again in Week 6 of the  season in Kansas City, with both teams having identical 4–1 records. The first half of that game ended in a similar fashion to the finish of the 2021 irritation. After a second quarter Gabe Davis touchdown reception, the Chiefs trailed 10–7 with 12 seconds left in the half. However, Mahomes led the Chiefs down the field the Bills' 43-yard line, Harrison Butker kicked a successful 62-yard field goal to tie the game at 10. The Bills went on to win the game 24–20 on a Dawson Knox touchdown reception with 1:04 remaining in the fourth quarter.

Renewed discussion of NFL overtime rules and postseason rule change
The NFL's overtime rules received renewed criticism following the game. Several commentators argued that Allen should have been given the opportunity to play in overtime and felt the Chiefs' victory was mostly attributable to winning the coin toss. The outcome was compared to Kansas City's loss in the 2018 AFC Championship Game, where Mahomes was unable to play in overtime after the New England Patriots won the coin toss and scored a touchdown on their opening drive. This prompted the Chiefs to unsuccessfully lobby for changes to the overtime rules, which would later benefit them against the Bills.

Following the game, Reid stated he was still open to a rule change that would allow both teams the opportunity to receive the ball in overtime. Bills tackle Dion Dawkins was among the players critical of the overtime rules, remarking that the league "should never let a football game be determined from a coin". Conversely, Allen said he had no issue with the overtime rules and Buffalo did not do enough to win the game. Mahomes, acknowledging the rules' impact on the 2018 AFC Championship, remarked, "All you can do is play the way the rules are explained and that's what we did today."

The Bengals winning the AFC Championship against the Chiefs, despite losing the overtime coin toss, prompted defense of the rules. Discussing football's team-based nature, commentators noted that the Bengals defense made a key stop in overtime, which the Bills defense could not do in the Divisional game.

At the owners' meetings in March 2022, the league voted to change the postseason overtime rules. Beginning with the 2022–23 NFL playoffs, both teams are assured of one possession in overtime, even if the first team with possession scores a touchdown.

Officials
Referee: John Hussey (35)
Line judge: Carl Johnson (101)
Down judge: Mark Hittner (28) 
Side judge: Allen Baynes (56)
Umpire: Alan Eck (76) 
Field judge: Rick Patterson (15)
Back judge: Dino Paganelli (105)
Replay official: James Nicholson (0)

See also
Triskaidekaphobia
Two-minute drill

Notes

References

AFC Divisional playoff game (Buffalo-Kansas City)
Buffalo Bills postseason
Kansas City Chiefs postseason
National Football League playoff games
Nicknamed sporting events
AFC Divisional playoff game (Buffalo-Kansas City)
AFC Divisional playoff game (Buffalo-Kansas City)